Menas  or Minas, throne name Admas Sagad I (Ge’ez: አድማስ ሰገድ, died 1563), was Emperor of Ethiopia from 1559 until his death in 1563, and a member of the Solomonic dynasty. He was a brother of Gelawdewos and the son of Emperor Dawit II

Early life 
According to a genealogy collected by James Bruce, Menas' father Lebna Dengel arranged Menas to be married to the daughter of Robel, governor of Bora and Selawe; upon becoming empress she took the name Adimas Moas. They had two children, Fiqtor and Theodora.

During Ahmad ibn Ibrahim al-Ghazi's invasion of Ethiopia, Menas had been captured but treated well as a valuable prisoner. The typical fate of prisoners of war at the time was to be castrated and enslaved. This clemency came to an end in 1542, when the Imam,  desperate for help from his fellow Muslims, included Menas in an assortment of extravagant gifts to the sultan of Yemen in return for military aid. However, Imam Ahmad's son was later captured in the aftermath of the Battle of Wayna Daga, Gelawdewos used his prisoner to recover his brother Menas; according to Pankhurst, "when the royal family was reunited there were many days of celebrations."

Reign 
Menas was crowned emperor at Mengista Samayat, now called Mengisto, southwest of Debre Werq in Gojjam, and shortly afterwards he campaigned against the Beta israel in Semien province.

Menas made no use of his ancestors capitals in Shewa and Fatagar or of his predecessor's (Galawdewos) in Wej, and instead He established his residence in Guba'e (now known as Emfraz) a settlement located near Lake tana.

He banished the Jesuit bishop André de Oviedo and his companions to a village between Axum and Adwa called Maigwagwa (Tigrinya may gwagwa, 'noisy water'), which the Jesuits had optimistically renamed Fremona, after the missionary Frumentius.

About one year into his reign, Bahr Negus Yeshaq rose in revolt in Tigray against Menas, proclaiming Tazkaro, the illegitimate son of Emperor Menas' brother, Yaqob, as negus. Tazkaro was supported by the leader of the Portuguese who had followed Cristóvão da Gama into Ethiopia, and allegedly by "the Prime Men of the Kingdom." This revolt occupied Menas' attention for the remainder of his short reign. He marched into Lasta, at which point Yeshaq retreated into Shire. The emperor found him there and defeated Yeshaq, then turned south to Emfraz where he defeated the remaining supporters of Tazkaro on 2 July 1561. Tazkaro was captured, and Menas afterwards ordered him thrown from the rock of Lamalmon to his death.

Bahr Negash Yeshaq then obtained the support of Özdemir, the Ottoman Pasha of Massawa, and proclaimed Tazkaro's infant brother, Marqos, nəgusä nägäst. 
In April 20, 1562 Emperor Menas defeated, or at least put to flight, Bahr Negash Yeshaq and his Turkish, Arab, and Portuguese allies.

According to the Royal Chronicle of his reign, which Bruce follows in his account, the Emperor fell back to Atronsa Maryam to regroup for another assault on the Bahr Negash, but came down with a fever during the march, and died at Kolo on 1 February 1563. Budge, however, states Minas returned to Shewa, and then to the lowlands of Wag, where he was seized by the fever and died after a short illness.

Notes 

1563 deaths
16th-century monarchs in Africa
16th-century emperors of Ethiopia
Solomonic dynasty
Year of birth unknown